The 1950 Temple Owls football team was an American football team that represented Temple University as an independent during the 1950 college football season. In its second season under head coach Albert Kawal, the team compiled a 4–4–1 record and outscored opponents by a total of 173 to 132. The team played its home games at Temple Stadium in Philadelphia.

Schedule

References

Temple
Temple Owls football seasons
Temple Owls football